Sapne Suhane Ladakpan Ke (International Title: Young Dreams) is an Indian television series, which premiered on 21 May 2012 and was broadcast on Zee TV. The show was all about celebrating adolescence depicting the lives of two teenage girls, Gunjan and Rachna. The teenage years mark the real beginning of a person's blossoming youth and the events that occur in one's life in this period leave permanent imprints affecting his/her personality.
The Show Was Dubbed In English and aired on Zee World on DSTv channel: 166. The show ended on 23 January 2015.

Premise
The show follows the lives of two teenage girls, Gunjan and Rachna. It shows stages in their lives including love, marriage and other problems faced by young women.

Plot
Gunjan Sandhu, a fun-loving girl lives in Mumbai with her mother Sneha. Her father Aakash lives for his business in Australia. Suffering cancer, Sneha expresses concern for Gunjan. Shy and introverted, Rachna Garg hails from Benaras. Her father, Dayal wants to get her married off if she fails in her exams. As Sneha dies, Rachna's mother Shail brings Gunjan to Benaras.With many difficulties Gunjan settles herself to Family much to Dayal's dismay due to her city lifestyle and modern ideas. 

The Gargs later celebrate their son Mayank's return to home. Rachna and Gunjan become friends. Rachna is interested in hockey. Later, Dayal also supports her, but fixes her wedding to Vihaan, who flirts with Gunjan. She exposes him and the alliance is broken off. Gunjan and Mayank fall in love and try to elope but on wedding she rejects the idea of cheating parents and tells Mayank to return home and they return. Shail announces Mayank and Gunjan's wedding, but on the day, Charu marries him.

Rachna, her boss Kabir and Gunjan expose Charu, who is jailed. Gunjan and Mayank marry. Working in Kabir's company, Rachna falls for him but he leaves her for caring for Bittu, his mentally ill brother. She decides to care for him and leaves. Mayank and Gunjan start fighting and part ways.

6 months later
Mayank and Gunjan miss each other, returning home to tell family they failed to unite. Bittu is hospitalised; Rachna still cares of him. It turns out that Gunjan has lost her memory due to an accident, a truth that also leaves Rachna heartbroken. She finds a job of decorator at the house of Omkar Luthra, who is shocked to see her because she looks like his late wife, Divya.

Omkar's son Lucky is attached to Rachna, thinking she's Divya. Omkar learns that his brother Lalit killed Divya, and gets him arrested. He thanks Rachna, who consoles Lucky. Gunjan and Mayank affirm to forget the past and start afresh. Kabir returns, and Rachna still loves him. Eventually, he also realises his love for her but due to his past deeds Rachna's family first disagrees but later accepts him and they marry.
Rachna and Gunjan turn out to be pregnant. In the end, all family members pose for a group photo.

Special episode and events
"Rachna Ki Sagai" was a special episode broadcast on 19 January 2013. The episode showcases Rachna and Vihaan's engagement ceremony. The episode was graced by various television actors performing on different songs.

Guest List (Sagai)

Ajay Devgn
Tamannaah Bhatia
Sajid Khan
Ankita Lokhande 
Karanvir Bohra 
Sara Khan 
Rubina Dilaik 
Suhasi Dhami 
Rithvik Dhanjani 
Asha Negi
Ashish Sharma 
Ekta Kaul 
Kanan Malhotra 
Neha Janpandit 
Annirudh Dave 
Vibha Chibber 
Vindhya Tiwari 
Pankaj Kansara 
Swati Bajpayi
Preet Kaur

"Ladakpan Ke Suhane Rang" was a three-hour Holi special event hosted by Zee TV celebrated on the sets of Sapne Suhane Ladakpan Ke wherein various actors from the Zee TV family performed. The episode showcases the Holi of three different states, including Shail of Sapne Suhane Ladakpan Ke celebrating Holi in Uttar Pradesh style, Neetu of Ek Mutthi Aasman and Saavri Bua of Aur Pyaar Ho Gaya showcasing Holi of Punjab and Rajasthan.
 
"Dawat-E-Eid" was an Eid special event on the sets of Qubool Hai where Rachna and Mayank gave their individual performances. A crossover episode was filmed with Ek Mutthi Aasmaan on 5 May 2014.

Cast

Main
 Roopal Tyagi as Gunjan Garg (née Sandhu): Aakash and Sneha's daughter; Rachna's best friend; Mayank's wife (2012–2015)
 Mahima Makwana as 
Rachna Tripathi (née Garg): Dayal and Shail's younger daughter; Pihu's younger sister; Gunjan's best friend; Mayank and Dhollu's cousin; Chaya's friend; Kabir's wife (2012–2015)
Divya Luthra: Omkar's wife; Lucky's mother (2014)
 Ankit Gera as Mayank Garg: Prabhu and Seema's son; Pihu, Rachna and Dhollu's cousin; Charu's ex-husband; Gunjan's husband (2012–2015)
 Piyush Sahdev as Kabir Tripathi: Bittu's brother; Rachna's husband (2012–2015)

Recurring
 Ali Hassan as Omkar "Om" Luthra: Lalit's brother; Divya's widower; Lucky's father (2014)
 Harsh Rajput as Banshul "Bittu" Tripathi: Kabir's brother (2014–2015)
 Vaishnavi Mahant as Shail Garg: Dayal's wife; Pihu and Rachna's mother (2012–2015)
 Nidhi Jha as Chaya Khanna: Rachna's friend (2012–2013)
 Shakti Singh as Dayal Garg: Prabhu and Gopal's brother; Shail's husband; Pihu and Rachna's father (2012–2015)
 Diwakar Pundir as Aakash Kumar Sandhu: Sneha's widower; Gunjan's father (2012–2015)
 Chandan Madan as Vikrant "Vicky" Gadgill
 Bhuvnesh Shetty as Prabhu Garg: Dayal and Gopal's brother; Seema's husband; Mayank's father (2012–2015)
 Alkaa Mogha as Seema Garg: Prabhu's wife; Mayank's mother (2012–2015)
 Akanksha Gilani as Pihu Garg: Shail and Dayal's elder daughter; Rachna's elder sister; Mayank and Dhollu's cousin (2012–2015)
 Anshul Singh as Murali
 Meet Mukhi as Lakshman "Dhollu" Garg: Sangeeta and Gopal's son; Pihu, Rachna and Mayank's cousin (2012–2015)
 Parakh Madan as Bindiya Choudhry
 Rahul Sharma as Vikram
 Sanket Choukse as Lalwind "Lalit" Luthra: Omkar's brother (2014)
 Ankit Bhardwaj as Vachan Singh (2014)
 Aanchal Khurana as Charu Garg: Mayank's ex-wife (2012–2014)
 Chandrika Saha as Sonal 
 Nikhil Chaddha as Vihaan Agarwal: Savitri's son; Rajeev's brother; Rachna's ex-fiancé (2012–2013)
 Joyshree Arora as Manvira Tripathi: Kabir and Bittu's grandmother (2013–2015) 
 Madhavi Gogate as Jiji
 Shabana Mullani as Sangeeta Garg: Gopal's wife; Dhollu's mother (2012–2015)
 Shresth Kumar as Aditya
 Manasi Salvi as Sneha Sandhu: Aakash's wife; Gunjan's mother (2012)
 Seema Pandey as Savitri Agarwal: Vihaan and Rajeev's mother (2012–2013)
 Mamta Luthra as Mausiji
 Preet Mulani as Sangeeta
 Shamikh Abbas as Gopal Garg: Dayal and Prabhu's brother; Sangeeta's husband; Dhollu's father
 Zohaib Siddiqui as Rajeev Agarwal: Savitri's son; Vihaan's brother (2012–13)
 Astha Agarwal as Vidhi Sethi: a disguised gang leader (2014)
 Guru Paramanand
 Divya Jagdale as Shalini 
 Ajay Devgn in a cameo appearance in the Holi episode
 Tamannaah Bhatia in a cameo appearance in the Holi episode
 Sajid Khan in a cameo appearance in the Holi episode
 Nishant Pandey as Shree

Production

Development and Premier
The series produced by Shakuntalam Telefilms was a story depicting the lives of youth and the problems they face. The show premiered on 21 May 2012 at 2:00 pm (UTC) and airs from Monday to Friday. At the launch event, while talking about the show, Sukesh Motwani, Fiction Head of Zee TV, said, "Sapne Suhane Ladakpan ke is all about celebrating adolescence. The show is full of hope, aspirations, wish, longing, desire and yearning. The idea was to enrich the lives of the viewers through an endearing content which will remind them of their carefree wonder years." Further, producer Neelima Bajpai, said, "We’ve made the show look youthful and appealing".

Casting

Roopal Tyagi and Mahima Makwana were cast to play lead roles of Gunjan and Rachna respectively. Vaishnavi Mahant and Manasi Salvi were cast to play the prominent roles. Ankit Gera was paired opposite Roopal Tyagi. Apparently Nikhil Chaddha was paired opposite Mahima Makwana, after his exit, in December 2013, Piyush Sahdev had been hired to play Mahima Makwana's love interest. After a six-month leap, Ali Hassan makes an entry in the show to play Omkar, opposite Divya (resemblance of Rachna's face). However, soon his track ended, and after three months re-enter the show recovering from his knee injury. Aanchal Khurana was hired to play main villan role of Charu. The rest of the cast included Alka Mogha, Harsh Rajput, Shakti Singh and Ahmad Harhash as Piyush Malhotra.

Reception
The show was among the top-rated Indian shows and had often made its placed in the ten most watched Hindi GEC's show. In week 6,2013 with the rating of 4.3 TVR the show climbed to NO.1 spot in the Hindi GEC space, with reference to the show's success the Hindustan Times stated "Television's prime time slot gets redefined". The report published on May 4, 2013, stated that with 2.9 Trp the show achieved  3 position among top 10 fictional shows. An article published by toi in 2013 quoting, "Love stories pulling up TRPs on small screen", mentioned that the show received 4.0 Trp in week 4. Yet another report published on June 29, 2013, stated that the show remained at  6 among top 10 fiction shows Top 10 fiction shows with the rating of 2.6. In week 16,2013, with the Trp of 2.5 show remained at  6. In week 17,2014 it averaged to 5.3 TVR. However, it week 18,2014 it averaged to 4.7 TVR.

Awards and nominations

References

External links
 
 

Zee TV original programming
2012 Indian television series debuts
2015 Indian television series endings
Indian television soap operas